Asian Highway 1 (AH1) is the longest route of the Asian Highway Network, running  from Tokyo, Japan via Korea, China, Southeast Asia, Bangladesh, India, Pakistan, Afghanistan and Iran to the border between Turkey and Bulgaria west of Istanbul where it joins end-on with European route E80, running all the way to Lisbon, Portugal.

Japan

The 1200-kilometre section in Japan was added to the system in November 2003. It runs along the following tolled expressways:
  Shuto Expressway C1 Inner Circular Route, Edobashi JCT to Tanimachi JCT via Takebashi JCT
  Shuto Expressway Route 3 Shibuya Line, Tanimachi JCT to Yoga Exit (Tokyo Interchange)
 , Tokyo Interchange to Komaki
 , Komaki to Suita via Kyoto
 , Suita to Kobe
 , Kobe to Hatsukaichi via Hiroshima
 Hiroshima Expressway (urban expressway), Hatsukaichi to Hatsukaichi Route 1
  Hatsukaichi   to Iwakuni
 , Iwakuni to Yamaguchi
 , Yamaguchi to Shimonoseki
, Shimonoseki to Kitakyushu
 , Kitakyushu to Fukuoka
  Fukuoka Expressway Route 4
  Fukuoka Expressway Route 1

 Camellia Line ferry to Busan, South Korea.

From Fukuoka, the Japan–Korea Undersea Tunnel has been proposed to provide a fixed crossing.

South Korea 

The section in South Korea mainly follows the Gyeongbu Expressway. The Highway Boundary of South and North Korea.

  : Busan-Centre - Busan-Dong-gu
  Busan City Route 11: Busan-Dong-gu - Busan-Geumjeong-gu
  Gyeongbu Expressway: Busan-Geumjeong-gu - Gyeongju - Daegu - Daejeon - Seoul-Seocho-gu
  Seoul City Route 41: Seoul-Seocho-gu - Seoul-Gangnam-gu - Seoul-Yongsan-gu
  Namsan 1st tunnel: Seoul-Yongsan-gu - Seoul-Jung-gu
  Seoul City Route 21: Seoul-Jung-gu - Seoul-Eunpyeong-gu
  National Route 1: Seoul-Eunpyeong-gu - Panmunjeom

North Korea
P'anmunjŏm - Kaesŏng
  Pyongyang-Kaesong Motorway: Kaesŏng - P'yŏngyang
  Pyongyang-Sinuiju Motorway (Under Construction): P'yŏngyang - Sinŭiju

China
 Within Dandong: New Yalu River Bridge - Guomen Avenue -  (Dandong Xinqu IC) -  Zhangjiabao JCT -  Dandong JCT
 : Dandong - Shenyang
 Within Shenyang: : Xiashengou JCT - Jinbaotai JCT - Beiliguan JCT
 : Shenyang - Jinzhou - Beijing
 Within Beijing: : Shiyuan JCT - Maju JCT - Shuangyuan JCT - Fangshan Liyuan JCT
 : Beijing - Shijiazhuang - Zhengzhou - Xinyang - Wuhan - Changsha - Xiangtan - Guangzhou
 Within Guangzhou: : Taihe JCT - Longshan JCT - Leping JCT - Hengjiang JCT
 : Guangzhou - Nanning
 : Nanning - Youyiguan

Guangzhou - Hong Kong branch 
 : Taihe JCT - Huocun JCT
 : Guangzhou - Shenzhen (Huanggang Port)

Hong Kong SAR, China

Guangzhou - Hong Kong branch 
 : Shenzhen Bay Port - Shenzhen Bay Bridge - Lam Tei
 : Lam Tei - Yuen Long Highway - San Tin Highway - Lok Ma Chau Control Point

Vietnam

 : Hữu Nghị Quan - Đồng Đăng - Hanoi - Vinh - Đồng Hới - Đông Hà - Huế - Đà Nẵng - Hội An - Quy Nhơn - Nha Trang - Phan Thiết - Biên Hòa - Ho Chi Minh
 : Ho Chi Minh - Mộc Bài

In future,  (Hữu Nghị Quan - Long Thành),  (Lộ 25 - Long Trường),  (Long Trường - Hóc Môn) and  will become to AH1 instead National Highway 1 and National Highway 22 in today.

Cambodia
  Route 1: Bavet - Phnom Penh
  Route 5: Phnom Penh - Poipet

Thailand

 Route 33: Aranyaprathet - Kabin Buri - Hin Kong
 Route 1: Hin Kong - Bang Pa In 
 Route 32:  - Bang Pa In - Chai Nat (Concurrent with )
 Route 1: Chai Nat - Tak (Concurrent with )
 Route 12: Tak - Mae Sot

Myanmar
 National Highway 8: Myawaddy - Payagyi
 Branch Yangon–Mandalay Expressway : Payagyi - Yangon
 Yangon–Mandalay Expressway: Payagyi - Meiktila - Mandalay
 National Highway 7: (Concurrent with ): Mandalay - Tamu

India (East)
 : Moreh - Imphal 
 : Imphal - Viswema - Kohima
 : Kohima - Chümoukedima - Dimapur - Doboka 
 : Doboka - Nagaon - Jorabat
 : Jorabat - Shillong
 : Shillong - Dawki

Bangladesh

 : Tamabil, Sylhet - Sylhet - Kanchpur - Dhaka
 : Dhaka-Mawa-Bhanga Expressway
 : Bhanga, Faridpur - Alipur, Faridpur
 : Alipur, Faridpur - Goalchamot, Faridpur
 : Faridpur - Jashore
 : Jashore - Benapole

India (West)

 : Petrapole - Barasat
 : Barasat - Kolkata Airport
 : Dankuni - Durgapur -Asansol - Dhanbad -Barhi - Mohania - Varanasi - Allahabad - Kanpur - Agra - New Delhi 
  / Grand Trunk Road: New Delhi - Sonipat - Ambala - Jalandhar
  / Grand Trunk Road: Jalandhar - Amritsar - Attari

Pakistan

 Grand Trunk Road, Wagah — Lahore
  Lahore — Islamabad
  Islamabad — Peshawar
  Peshawar — Torkham

Afghanistan
 Afghanistan Ring Highway: Jalalabad - Kabul - Kandahar - Delaram - Herat - Islam Qala

Iran
  : Islam Qala - Taybad
  : Taybad- Sang Bast
  : Sang Bast - Nishapur - Sabzevar - Shahrood - Damghan - Semnan - Tehran
  : Tehran - Qazvin - Zanjan - Tabriz
  : Tabriz - Bazargan

Turkey

  Road D100: Gürbulak - Doğubayazıt - Aşkale - Refahiye
  Road D200: Refahiye - Sivas - Ankara
  Otoyol 4: Ankara - Gerede - İstanbul
  Otoyol 7: İstanbul
  Otoyol 3: İstanbul - Edirne - - Kapıkule (Maritsa motorway)

Connection to E80

The E80 continues in the E-road network from the border station at Gürbulak in Turkey to Istanbul followed by E80 highways to Kapitan Andreevo/Kapıkule, Sofia, Niš, Pristina, Dubrovnik, Pescara, Rome, Genoa, Nice, Toulouse, Burgos, Valladolid, Salamanca and finally Lisbon on the Atlantic Ocean.

References

 
Asian Highway Network
Transport in Iran
Transport in North Korea
Roads in China
Transport in Cambodia
Transport in Myanmar
Transport in Japan
Roads in Afghanistan
Roads in Myanmar
Roads in Iran
Roads in Japan
Roads in Turkey
Roads in North Korea
Roads in South Korea
Roads in Vietnam
Roads in Cambodia
Roads in Thailand
Roads in India
Roads in Pakistan
Roads in Bangladesh
Transport in Vietnam
Highways in Bangladesh